Eudoxiu Hurmuzachi (also spelled Eudoxiu Hurmuzache) (September 29, 1812, Czernawka, Austria; February 10, 1874, Czernowitz, Austria, buried in Dulcești, Romania) was a Romanian historian, politician (Landeshauptmann of the Duchy of Bucovina) and patriot.

Origins 

Hurmuzachi was born into a family of old noble lineage (see Hurmuzachi brothers), as the second son of Doxache Hurmuzachi, at the family estate in Cernăuca, Austria (now Chornivka, Ukraine), located in the historic region of Bukovina. His father used to offer refuge to persecuted Romanian political leaders from Transylvania, and went into considerable debt for this.
Together with his brothers, Eudoxiu would become one of the leading figures of the Romanian national movement in Bukovina.

Activity 

Hurmuzachi went to Vienna to study history; there he experienced the events of 1848, and decided to interrupt his studies. He returned home and participated in the movement to introduce the Romanian language at the Theological Institute in Czernowitz (now Chernivtsi, Ukraine; known as Cernăuți during Romanian rule), and to establish a Romanian language and literature course at the Institute for Philosophic Studies, also in Czernowitz.

In 1849, he petitioned the Austrian emperor to transform Bukovina into a duchy of the Crown (a “crown land”, Kronland in German), with rights equal to those of the other lands and kingdoms of the Austrian Empire; the petition was granted.
He also contributed articles to the Bucovina newspaper in Cernăuți between 1848 and 1850. After the political upheaval abated, he returned to continue studying history at the Vienna State Archives.  At this time, the inhabitants around Câmpulung Moldovenesc asked him to do research in order to regain lands that had been confiscated from them. He was successful, and the people of Câmpulung erected a small stone monument as a token of their gratitude.

In 1861, he was elected as their representative in both the local council (Diet) of Bukovina and the Imperial Parliament in Vienna. In 1860, when Bukovina was incorporated into Galicia, he petitioned the emperor and the minister to re-establish the autonomy of the province. He was again successful, and Bukovina’s status as a crown land was restored. The emperor then named him captain of Bukovina in 1864. An imperial decree also granted him the title of baron.

On August 2, 1872 he was elected as a member of the Romanian Academy. 
Throughout his entire career as a historian, he collected and published 12 volumes of historical documents.

References 

I. G. Sbiera, "Hurmuzachi," Enciclopedia Română, (1900), II, 736-739. 
Nicolae Bănescu "Corespondența familiei Hurmuzaki cu Gheorghe Bariț" Vălenii-de-Munte, 1911. 
Teodor Bălan "Frații George și Alexandru Hurmuzachi și ziarul Bucovina", Cernauți, 1924. 
Teodor Bălan "Activitatea refugiaților moldoveni în Bucovina", Sibiu, 1944.

External links 
 James Chastain, Hurmuzachi Brothers, in online "Encyclopedia of 1848 revolutions"
 Carmen Preotesoiu, Patrioți cu inima, cu fapta, Jurnalul Național, 2 December 2005—article about the Hurmuzachi family

1812 births
1874 deaths
People from Chernivtsi Oblast
Barons of Austria
Romanian people of Greek descent
Ethnic Romanian politicians in Bukovina
Members of the Austrian House of Deputies (1867–1870)
Romanian nationalists
19th-century Romanian people
19th-century Romanian historians
Titular members of the Romanian Academy